Manuel Antonio Tocornal Grez (born 12 June 1817–15 August 1867) was a Chilean politician who served as President of the Senate of Chile.

External links
 BCN Profile

1817 births
1867 deaths
Chilean people
Chilean politicians
Presidents of the Senate of Chile